NGC 7001 is an intermediate spiral galaxy located about 300 million light-years away in the constellation Aquarius. NGC 7001 has an estimated diameter of 106,000 light-years. It was discovered by English astronomer John Herschel on July 21, 1827 and was also observed by Austrian astronomer Rudolf Spitaler on September 26, 1891.

See also 
 NGC 2
 Black Eye Galaxy
 List of NGC objects (7001–7840)
 List of NGC objects

References

External links 
 

Intermediate spiral galaxies
Aquarius (constellation)
7001
11663
065905
0-53-16
Astronomical objects discovered in 1827